Fincher is a surname. Notable people with the surname include:

 David Fincher, an American film director and producer.
 Stephen Fincher, an American politician
 Bill Fincher, an American college football player
 Alfred Fincher, an American football linebacker
 Bob Fincher, an American politician
 Jack Fincher (footballer), an Australian footballer
 Jack Fincher (screenwriter), an American screenwriter and father of David Fincher